Pierpont is a village in Boone County, Missouri, United States. It is part of the Columbia, Missouri Metropolitan Statistical Area. The population was 64 at the 2020 census. The village, located south of Rock Bridge Memorial State Park at Route N and Highway 163, was incorporated in 2004 to avoid annexation by the city of Columbia. It is now an independent village with its own governing board of trustees.

Geography

Demographics

2010 census
As of the census of 2010, there were 76 people, 32 households, and 25 families residing in the village. The racial makeup of the village was 97.4% White, 1.3% African American, and 1.3% from two or more races.

There were 32 households, of which 25.0% had children under the age of 18 living with them, 75.0% were married couples living together, 3.1% had a male householder with no wife present, and 21.9% were non-families. 18.8% of all households were made up of individuals, and 9.4% had someone living alone who was 65 years of age or older. The average household size was 2.38 and the average family size was 2.72.

The median age in the village was 54.3 years. 19.7% of residents were under the age of 18; 4% were between the ages of 18 and 24; 14.4% were from 25 to 44; 35.5% were from 45 to 64; and 26.3% were 65 years of age or older. The gender makeup of the village was 52.6% male and 47.4% female.

References

Villages in Boone County, Missouri
Columbia metropolitan area (Missouri)
Villages in Missouri